In the motorsport discipline of rallying, Group Rally2 is a formula of rally car specification determined by the FIA for use in its international competitions: the World Rally Championship (WRC) and regional championships. National rallying competitions also allow Group Rally2 cars to compete.
There are no subclasses despite the use of the word 'Group' in the name so 'Rally2' may be used alone with the same definition. The group was launched in 2019 with other similarly named groups after the introduction of the Rally Pyramid initiative to reorganise the classes of car and championships in international rallying was approved in June 2018.

The formula for Group Rally2 cars was taken from R5 class of Group R with the defining ruleset being renamed, this meant that any existing R5 car homologated or approved since their introduction in 2013 could continue to be used in Rally2 level competition. R5 cars were first introduced as an intended replacement for the S2000 car.

In years prior to 2019, 'Rally 2' was used to describe the rules and scenario allowing a rally competitor to restart a rally the day following a retirement. This was renamed 're-start after retirement' in FIA regulations from 2019. Rally2 should not be confused with R2 cars of Group R either, which are officially described as 'Rallye 2'.

Definition
Group Rally2 cars are defined in FIA document '2021 Appendix J - Article 261' as Touring Cars or Large Scale Series Production Cars, supercharged Petrol engine, 4-wheel drive. A production touring car with at least 2500 identical units manufactured must be homologated in Group A, with all the components and changes that make it a Group Rally2 car homologated in an extension. The power to weight ratio is 4.2kg/hp.

FIA Competition
Rally2 cars are placed in FIA 'RC2' sporting class alongside Group Rally2-kit, R4, NR4 and S2000 cars.

Cars

See also
 Rally Pyramid
 Groups Rally
 Group R - R5 (rallying)
 Group Rally1
 Group Rally3
 Group Rally4
 Group Rally5

References

External links

 

 
Rally groups